In Greek mythology, Lycus was a prince as the son of King Pandion II of Athens who later ruled Megara.

Family 
Lycus' mother was Pylia, daughter of King Pylas of Megara. He was the brother of Aegeus, Nisus, Pallas and the wife of Sciron.

Mythology 
Upon the death of Pandion, Lycus and his brothers took control of Athens from Metion who had seized the throne from Pandion. They divided the government in four but Aegeas became king. Pausanias reports that after getting driven out of Athens by his brother Aegeus, Lycus came to Aphareus and introduced him and his family to the rites of the Great Goddess. "The Lykos tradition is probably a pseudo-myth of no great antiquity, as the German scholar Treuber claimed on the grounds that there is no evidence of a family tree in Athenian genealogy; Treuber suggests that political motives may have helped to foster the tradition", reported T. R. Bryce. 

According to Herodotus, he gave his name to Lycia in Asia Minor, hitherto known as Tremilis/Termilae.

Notes

References 

 Apollodorus, The Library with an English Translation by Sir James George Frazer, F.B.A., F.R.S. in 2 Volumes, Cambridge, MA, Harvard University Press; London, William Heinemann Ltd. 1921. ISBN 0-674-99135-4. Online version at the Perseus Digital Library. Greek text available from the same website.
 Herodotus, The Histories with an English translation by A. D. Godley. Cambridge. Harvard University Press. 1920. . Online version at the Topos Text Project. Greek text available at Perseus Digital Library.
 Pausanias, Description of Greece with an English Translation by W.H.S. Jones, Litt.D., and H.A. Ormerod, M.A., in 4 Volumes. Cambridge, MA, Harvard University Press; London, William Heinemann Ltd. 1918. . Online version at the Perseus Digital Library
 Pausanias, Graeciae Descriptio. 3 vols. Leipzig, Teubner. 1903.  Greek text available at the Perseus Digital Library.
 Strabo, The Geography of Strabo. Edition by H.L. Jones. Cambridge, Mass.: Harvard University Press; London: William Heinemann, Ltd. 1924. Online version at the Perseus Digital Library.
 Strabo, Geographica edited by A. Meineke. Leipzig: Teubner. 1877. Greek text available at the Perseus Digital Library.

Princes in Greek mythology
Ancient Megarians
Attican characters in Greek mythology
Ancient Megara